Dalgan County is in Sistan and Baluchestan province, Iran. The capital of the county is the city of Galmurti. At the 2006 census, the region's population (as Dalgan District of Iranshahr County) was 52,419 in 9,894 households. The following census in 2011 counted 62,813 people in 13,580 households, by which time the district had been separated from the county to form Dalgan County. At the 2016 census, the county's population was 67,857 in 16,551 households.

Administrative divisions

The population history and structural changes of Dalgan County's administrative divisions over three consecutive censuses are shown in the following table. The latest census shows two districts, five rural districts, and one city.

References

 

Counties of Sistan and Baluchestan Province